Abd al-Hadi may refer to:
Abd al-Hadi (name)
Abd al-Hadi Palace in Nābulus, Palestine